Tricomia or Trikomia was a town  in the eastern part of ancient Phrygia, inhabited during Roman and Byzantine times.

Its site is tentatively located near İlkburun in Asiatic Turkey, by some authors, but left unlocated by others.

References

Populated places in Phrygia
Former populated places in Turkey
Roman towns and cities in Turkey
Populated places of the Byzantine Empire
Lost ancient cities and towns